Florent Hadergjonaj (born 31 July 1994) is a professional footballer who plays as a right-back for Süper Lig club Kasımpaşa. Born in Switzerland, he represents the Kosovo national team. He previously represented Switzerland at youth and senior levels.

Club career

Early career
Hadergjonaj is a product of various Swiss youth teams such as Langnau, Thun and Luzern. In 2011, he joined youth team of Young Boys.

Young Boys
Hadergjonaj is a youth exponent from Young Boys, he made his first Swiss Super League appearance on 29 September 2013 after being named in the starting line-up in a 1–0 home defeat against Zürich. Hadergjonaj made 11 league appearances during the 2013–14 season and he won the Young Boys' player of the year award after one year and a half from his debut.

Ingolstadt 04
On 8 August 2016, Hadergjonaj joined Bundesliga side Ingolstadt 04, on a four-year contract. On 22 October 2016, he made his debut against Borussia Dortmund after being named in the starting line-up, and assist in the third goal during a 3–3 draw.

Loan at Huddersfield Town

On 24 August 2017, Hadergjonaj joined Premier League side Huddersfield Town, on a season-long loan. On 19 September 2017, he made his debut with Huddersfield Town in the 2017–18 EFL Cup third round against Crystal Palace after being named in the starting line-up.

Return to Huddersfield Town
On 8 March 2018, Huddersfield Town triggered a clause in Hadergjonaj's loan agreement to make his transfer permanent. On 1 July 2018, he signed for Huddersfield Town on a three-year contract with a club option of a further season. On 11 August 2018, he made his debut in a 3–0 home defeat against Chelsea after being named in the starting line-up.

Loan at Kasımpaşa
On 31 January 2020, Hadergjonaj joined Süper Lig side Kasımpaşa, on a six-month-long loan. Two days later, he made his debut in a 1–1 away draw against Ankaragücü after being named in the starting line-up.

Return to Kasımpaşa
On 25 September 2020, Hadergjonaj signed a three-year contract with Süper Lig club Kasımpaşa. One day later, he made his debut in a 1–0 away defeat against Hatayspor after being named in the starting line-up.

International career

Switzerland

Under-20
On 15 November 2013, Hadergjonaj made his debut with Switzerland U20 in a friendly match against Poland U20 after being named in the starting line-up.

Under-21
On 4 April 2014, Hadergjonaj made his debut with Switzerland U21 in a 2015 UEFA European Under-21 Championship qualification match against Ukraine U21 after being named in the starting line-up.

Senior

On 22 May 2017, Hadergjonaj received a call-up from Switzerland for the friendly match against Belarus and the 2018 FIFA World Cup qualification match against Faroe Islands. On 1 October 2017, he made his debut with Switzerland in a friendly match against Belarus after coming on as a substitute at 46th minute in place of Silvan Widmer.

Kosovo
On 9 May 2019, The Football Federation of Kosovo confirmed that Hadergjonaj had obtained a Kosovan passport and was ready to play for the Kosovo national team in the next UEFA Euro 2020 qualifying matches. On 22 May 2019, Hadergjonaj received a call-up from Kosovo for the UEFA Euro 2020 qualifying matches against Montenegro and Bulgaria.

Career statistics

Club

International

Scores and results list Kosovo's goal tally first, score column indicates score after each Hadergjonaj goal.

Honours
Individual
Young Boys' player of the year: 2014–15

References

External links

1994 births
Living people
People from Deçan
People from Emmental District
Dual internationalists (football)
Kosovan footballers
Kosovo international footballers
Kosovan expatriate footballers
Kosovan expatriate sportspeople in Switzerland
Kosovan expatriate sportspeople in Germany
Kosovan expatriate sportspeople in England
Kosovan expatriate sportspeople in Turkey
Swiss men's footballers
Switzerland youth international footballers
Switzerland under-21 international footballers
Switzerland international footballers
Swiss expatriate footballers
Swiss expatriate sportspeople in Germany
Swiss expatriate sportspeople in England
Swiss expatriate sportspeople in Turkey
Association football fullbacks
Swiss Super League players
BSC Young Boys players
Bundesliga players
2. Bundesliga players
FC Ingolstadt 04 players
Premier League players
English Football League players
Huddersfield Town A.F.C. players
Süper Lig players
Kasımpaşa S.K. footballers
Sportspeople from the canton of Bern